Charles Peter Cartwright Kendall (born 29 December 1938) is a former English cricketer.  Kendall was a left-handed batsman who bowled right-arm fast-medium.  He was born at Penryn, Cornwall.

Kendall made his Minor Counties Championship debut for Cornwall in 1961 against Dorset.  From 1961 to 1975, he represented the county in 36 Minor Counties Championship matches, the last of which came against Dorset.

Kendall also represented Cornwall in 2 List A matches.  These came against Glamorgan in the 1970 Gillette Cup and Oxfordshire in the 1975 Gillette Cup.  In his 2 List A matches, he scored 10 runs at a batting average of 5.00, with a high score of 10.  With the ball he took a single wicket at a bowling average of 83.00, with best figures of 1/42.

References

External links
Peter Kendall at Cricinfo
Peter Kendall at CricketArchive

1938 births
Living people
People from Penryn, Cornwall
English cricketers
Cornwall cricketers